Adamawa or Adamaua may refer to :

Places and jurisdictions in West Africa 
 Adamawa Plateau, which rises in Nigeria, cuts across Cameroon, and terminates in the Central African Republic

Present
 Adamawa Region, Cameroon
 Adamawa State, Nigeria

Historical 
 Adamawa Emirate, founded by and named after Modibo Adama
 The former Catholic Apostolic Prefecture of Adamaua

Other 
 Adamawa languages, a family of languages spoken in the above area
 Adamawa (cattle), an African breed of cattle